Eugene Otto "Buck" Zumhofe (born March 21, 1951) is a convicted sex offender and former American professional wrestler better known as "The King of Rock n' Roll" Buck Zumhofe. In 2014, Zumhofe was sentenced to 25 years in prison for criminal sexual conduct.

Professional wrestling career
Zumhofe was trained by Verne Gagne along with Ricky Steamboat, Scott Irwin and The Iron Sheik. As part of his gimmick, he carried a boombox around at all times, and he became a popular light heavyweight competitor in the American Wrestling Association (AWA) in the early and mid 1980s. He feuded primarily with "Mr. Electricity" Steve Regal over the AWA World Light Heavyweight Championship during that time. Zumhofe also wrestled in World Class Championship Wrestling (WCCW) where he teamed with Iceman King Parsons as the Rock 'n' Soul Connection. The team held the WCCW American Tag Team titles twice and rose to main event status on the World Class weekly tour loop as the Von Erichs (the established main event talents) would only wrestle in major cities. As a singles wrestler in WCCW, Zumhofe reached the final of the TV title tournament in March 1985, where he lost to Rip Oliver. Zumhofe left WCCW in October 1985.

Returning to the AWA in 1985, he won his second AWA World Light Heavyweight Championship by defeating Steve Regal, but was forced to vacate the title in July 1986 after he was sent to prison following his conviction for sexual misconduct. In 1988, he wrestled for Windy City Wrestling and Pro Wrestling America. In 1989, after his release from prison, Zumhofe again returned to the AWA. In 1990, he won the AWA World Light Heavyweight title for the third time, defeating Jonnie Stewart. He feuded with Stewart over the title until the promotion closed in 1991.

Zumhofe also made sporadic appearances for the World Wrestling Federation as a jobber during the 80s and 90s. He was the first wrestler to be put in a body bag by The Undertaker and was also the wrestler who Triple H faced in his WWF debut. During Zumhofe's career he also wrestled for Roy Shire's promotion in San Francisco, in Vancouver for Al Tomko, in Portland for Don Owen, and in Japan for Giant Baba.

In 2000, Zumhofe opened the Rock & Roll Wrestling promotion, which ran shows in Minnesota, Iowa, Illinois, Wisconsin, and North and South Dakota.

Legal issues
Zumhofe was jailed in July 1986 when he was found guilty of sexual misconduct involving a minor. Zumhofe also served 36 months in prison after being convicted of fourth degree sexual conduct with a minor on January 23, 1989.

Zumhofe was again arrested on May 27, 2013, and charged with twelve felony counts of criminal sexual misconduct for sexually abusing his daughter between June 1999 and June 2011, beginning when she was 15 years old. He was convicted on all twelve counts on March 5, 2014. Following the verdict, Zumhofe attempted to flee from the court house, but was quickly tackled by court officers and charged with "escape from custody".
On May 6, 2014, he was sentenced to 25 years in prison on two first-degree and two third-degree counts of criminal sexual conduct. The judge ordered the sentences on the four counts to be served consecutively.  His escape from custody charges were eventually sentenced to run concurrently with his 2014 criminal sexual conduct sentence.

Championships and accomplishments
American Wrestling Association
AWA World Light Heavyweight Championship (3 times)
Midwest Pro Wrestling
MPW Tag Team Championship (1 time) – with Buck Zumhofe, Jr.
Nu-Age Wrestling
NAW Light Heavyweight Championship (1 time)
World Class Championship Wrestling
NWA American Tag Team Championship (2 times) – with Iceman Parsons

References

External links
Online World of Wrestling profile
 Minnesota Department of Corrections Offender Locator
 

1951 births
20th-century American criminals
21st-century American criminals
American male professional wrestlers
American people convicted of child sexual abuse
Criminals from Minnesota
Living people
American rapists
People convicted of incest
People from Carver County, Minnesota
People from Ham Lake, Minnesota
People from Lafayette County, Wisconsin
Prisoners and detainees of Minnesota
Professional wrestlers from Minnesota
Professional wrestlers from Wisconsin
20th-century professional wrestlers
AWA World Light Heavyweight Champions